Duloe stone circle or Duloe circle is a stone circle near the village of Duloe, located  from Looe in southeast Cornwall, England, UK.

Description
It is made of eight bright white quartzite stones placed in an oval shaped circle. Its original width is unknown as it was moved in 1861 due to an intersecting hedge. Two of the stones were broken in the manoeuvre. It was also claimed that a Bronze Age urn full of bones was smashed after being found under one of the stones and allegedly crumbled into the air. It can be accessed near Duloe village on the B3254, signposted on the west of the road in a field. The site inspired the 2006 video game Barrow Hill.

Literature

References

External links

 Cornwall's Archaeological Heritage - field guide to accessible sites - Duloe stone circle
 Illustrated entry in the Megalithic Portal
 Illustrated entry in the Modern Antiquarian
 Pastscape - English Heritage entry about Duloe stone circle
 

Stone circles in Cornwall